Rodolfo Aínsa Escartín (17 September 1944 – 26 August 2021) was a Spanish politician who served as a Senator.

References

1944 births
2021 deaths
Spanish politicians
People's Party (Spain) politicians
Members of the 8th Senate of Spain
People from Alto Gállego